The Big Wainihinihi River is a river in the Westland district of New Zealand. It is a tributary of the Taramakau River.

See also
List of rivers of New Zealand

References
Land Information New Zealand - Search for Place Names

Westland District
Rivers of the West Coast, New Zealand
Rivers of New Zealand